Henry Chapin (May 13, 1811 – October 13, 1878) was a judge, a state legislator, and a three-term mayor of Worcester, Massachusetts.

Early life and career
Chapin, a native of Upton, Massachusetts, graduated from Brown University in 1835. He served as an educator in Upton, studied law at Cambridge, and passed the Massachusetts Bar in 1838. He practiced law in Uxbridge from 1838 to 1846, and became an amateur local historian in that community.

Later public service
Chapin represented the local district in the state legislature, served as the State's Commissioner of Insolvency, and on the State Board of Education.

In 1848, he was appointed chief Judge of the Worcester County Probate and Insolvency Court. Judge Chapin was later elected for three terms as Mayor of Worcester. In 1853, Mayor Chapin was nominated by the Republican Party for a Congressional seat, which he declined. A lifelong Unitarian, Chapin served in church leadership positions.
 Chapin was elected a member of the American Antiquarian Society in 1853.

A historical address
In 1864, he delivered a later published historical address in Uxbridge, which records the story of America's first legal colonial woman voter. He is later simply known as "Judge Henry Chapin".

Afterwards
Judge Chapin was asked to serve as Mayor of Worcester, one more time. On December 18, 1870, Chapin was appointed mayor, ad interim, by the city council, in joint convention, December 19, 1870, to fill the vacancy caused by the death of James B. Blake. Chapin served until Edward Earle was elected in a special election to serve out the remainder of Mayor Blake's term. In 1877 Chapin developed ill health; he died at age 67, in Worcester, on October 13, 1878.

References

1811 births
1878 deaths
People from Upton, Massachusetts
Brown University alumni
Massachusetts Free Soilers
Massachusetts lawyers
People from Uxbridge, Massachusetts
Members of the Massachusetts Governor's Council
Mayors of Worcester, Massachusetts
American Unitarians
Members of the American Antiquarian Society
19th-century American lawyers